The Morse–Tay–Leland–Hawes House is a historic house in Sherborn, Massachusetts.

The farmhouse was built about 1700 by James Morse (born 1686), and added to the National Register of Historic Places in 1986. It consists of a -story main house in 4 bays, with single story rear wing. Surface treatments are late Georgian in style, probably added by Dr. Jonathan Tay in the 1770s or 1780s, and include a semicircular fanlight and narrow Doric pilasters framing the front door.

See also
National Register of Historic Places listings in Sherborn, Massachusetts

References

Houses on the National Register of Historic Places in Middlesex County, Massachusetts
Houses in Sherborn, Massachusetts
Georgian architecture in Massachusetts